Amal Basha is a Yemeni women's rights activist, chair of the Sisters' Arab Forum for Human Rights (SAF). As the chair of SAF, she "defends the rights of women, prisoners and refugees, and fights for more political freedoms."

In April 2013 she publicly confronted Sheikh Sadiq al-Ahmar in the conference hall of Yemen's National Dialogue Conference: Ahmar seemed to be backing away from appointing feminist Nabila al-Zubair as chair of the body deciding the future of the disputed city of Sa'dah until Basha gave him this "public flaying".

She won the Takreem Arab Woman of the Year Award in 2014. In 2015, she spoke at the Women's Power to Stop War Conference.

References

External links
 Interview with Amal Basha, Chairperson of the Sisters’ Arab Forum for Human Rights (SAF), Yemen, fidh.org, 7 March 2011

Yemeni women's rights activists
Year of birth missing (living people)
Living people
Place of birth missing (living people)